CJAB-FM is a French-language Canadian radio station located in Saguenay, Quebec. Its studios are located at Rue Racine Est in the former city of Chicoutimi (co-located with sister stations CFIX-FM and Noovo owned-and-operated station CFRS-DT), with its transmitter atop Mount Valin.

Owned and operated by Bell Media, it broadcasts on 94.5 MHz using a directional antenna with a peak effective radiated power of 100,000 watts (class C).

The station has a mainstream rock format and is part of the "Énergie" network which operates across Quebec. It started operations as a sister station to CKRS-FM (now owned by Cogeco-affiliated Radio Saguenay since September 2010).

The station has been part of the Énergie network since the early 1990s which operates across Quebec. CJAB started operations on May 10, 1979. The station was bought by Radiomutuel in 1992 (predecessor of Astral Media), along with then-sister station CKRS 98.3 (now owned by Cogeco-affiliated Radio Saguenay).

Notes

External links
 Énergie 94.5
 
 

Jab
Jab
Jab
Jab
Radio stations established in 1979
1979 establishments in Quebec